China Travel International Investment Hong Kong Limited is an investment holding company engaged in travel, theme park, hotel, resort, passenger transportation, golf club, power generation, freight forwarding and other investments. It was established and listed in Hong Kong in 1992.

Hong Kong has been an established as the central business and financial center for China and Asia. Although technically in China, it is governed independently, and therefore it must accrue its own funds to promote travel. Hong Kong is also considered a major hub to many airlines in Asia. Many people stop in Hong Kong from Europe on their way to Australia on business class flights. There are many business class flights to and from Hong Kong - in fact several airlines have flights with only business class seats.  Hong Kong International Airport is a major connection point to the rest of the world and every other continent.

References

External links
China Travel International Investment Hong Kong Limited

Companies listed on the Hong Kong Stock Exchange
Government-owned companies of China
Conglomerate companies of China
Financial services companies established in 1992
Conglomerate companies of Hong Kong